Tennis events at the 2001 Summer Universiade were held at the Muxiyuan Tennis Center  in Beijing, China.

Medal summary

Medal table

See also
 Tennis at the Summer Universiade

External links
World University Games Tennis on HickokSports.com

2001
Universiade
2001 Summer Universiade